Sigeru (Shigeru) Mizohata (December 30, 1924 – June 25, 2002) was a Japanese mathematician, who specialized in the theory of partial differential equations.

Biography 
Sigeru Mizohata graduated from the Faculty of Science at the Kyoto Imperial University in 1947, where he was studying under Hiroshi Okamura. From 1954 to 1957 he studied in France as an international student; this left a lasting impact, with many of his research papers subsequently published in French. His research interests mainly concerned hyperbolic partial differential equations and the use of functional analysis in the theory of PDEs. He was awarded an honorary doctorate by the University of Paris in 1986.

Books

Works

Mizohata, Sigeru (1965). Lectures on Cauchy Problem, Tata Institute of Fundamental Research.

References

1924 births
2002 deaths
20th-century Japanese mathematicians
Kyoto University alumni
Academic staff of Kyoto University